Sangan-e Olya (also Romanized as Sangān-e ‘Olyā; also known as Sangān, Sangak, Sangān-e Bālā, Sangyak, Sankān, and Zangān) is a village in Khandan Rural District, Tarom Sofla District, Qazvin County, Qazvin Province, Iran. At the 2006 census, its population was 171, in 47 families. This village is populated by Azerbaijani Turks.

References 

Populated places in Qazvin County